Shinobu Asagoe and Gisela Dulko were the defending champions, but both players decided not to participate in 2006.

Vania King and Jelena Kostanić won the title, defeating Mariana Díaz Oliva and Natalie Grandin in the final.

Seeds

 Li Ting /  Sun Tiantian (first round)
 Hsieh Su-wei /  Yan Zi (first round)
 Emma Laine /  Vladimíra Uhlířová (first round)
 Sania Mirza /  Tamarine Tanasugarn (first round, withdrew because of Mirza's stomach illness)

Draw

Draw

References

External links
 Main Draw 

Doubles
PTT Bangkok Open - Doubles
 in women's tennis